Robert Gwisdek (rapper name Käptn Peng) (born 29 January 1984) is a German actor and musician.

He is the son of the actors Michael Gwisdek and Corinna Harfouch and the brother of the musician Johannes Gwisdek (born 1980).

Selected filmography

Discography
 Die Zähmung der Hydra with his brother, Johannes Gwisdek, as shaban feat. Käptn Peng (2012)
 Expedition ins O as part of Käptn Peng und die Tentakel von Delphi (2013)
 Das nullte Kapitel as part of Käptn Peng und die Tentakel von Delphi (2017)

References

External links

 

1984 births
Living people
German male film actors
People from East Berlin